Ashe County Airport  is a county-owned, public-use airport in Ashe County, North Carolina, United States. It is located three nautical miles (6 km) east of the central business district of Jefferson, North Carolina. This airport is included in the National Plan of Integrated Airport Systems for 2011–2015, which categorized it as a general aviation facility.

Although most U.S. airports use the same three-letter location identifier for the FAA and IATA, Ashe County Airport is assigned GEV by the FAA but has no designation from the IATA (which assigned GEV to Gällivare Airport in Gällivare, Sweden). The airport's ICAO identifier is KGEV.

Facilities and aircraft 
Ashe County Airport covers an area of 106 acres (43 ha) at an elevation of 3,178 feet (969 m) above mean sea level. It has one runway designated 10/28 with an asphalt surface measuring 5001 by 75 feet (1,524 x 23 m).

For the 12-month period ending August 19, 2011, the airport had 10,400 aircraft operations, an average of 28 per day: 95% general aviation and 5% military. At that time there were 32 aircraft based at this airport: 97% single-engine and 3% multi-engine.

References

External links 
  at North Carolina DOT airport guide
 Aerial image as of March 1998 from USGS The National Map
 

Airports in North Carolina
Buildings and structures in Ashe County, North Carolina
North Carolina
County government agencies in North Carolina
Transportation in Ashe County, North Carolina